The 1992 municipal election was held October 22, 1992 to elect a mayor and twelve aldermen to sit on Edmonton City Council, nine trustees to sit on the public school board, and seven trustees to sit on the separate school board.  Edmontonians also decided one plebiscite question.

Voter turnout

There were 215,556 ballots cast out of 417,271 eligible voters, for a voter turnout of 51.7%.

Results

(bold indicates elected, italics indicate incumbent)

Mayor

Aldermen
Four women, eight men were elected as city councillors.

Public school trustees

One trustee is elected from each ward.  Additional trustees are elected by taking the non-victorious candidate with the most votes between each of Wards 1 and 4, Wards 2 and 3, and Ward 5 and 6.

Ward 1

Jean Woodrow - 8661
Esther Starkman - 6030
Leon Lubin - 4743
Neil Findlay - 2250
Adrian Greenwood - 1811
Rainer Ebel - 1260

Ward 2

Rose Rosenberger was acclaimed.

Ward 3

John Nicoll - 6174
Terry Sulyma - 3869
Christine Hahn - 4402
Larry Phillips - 2498
Denis Wall - 2099
Paul Early - 1249

Ward 4

Don Williams - 5014
Mimi Williams - 4362
Gord Stamp - 3920
Richard Gunderson - 3724

Ward 5

George Nicholson - 12955
Michael Ekelund - 4721
Reginald Berry - 3025
Rob Galbraith - 2345
Raj Shorey - 1475
David Salsbury - 1301

Ward 6

Dick Mather - 8710
Doug Tupper - 8346
Cori Doering 6880
Gordon Hum - 3199

Separate (Catholic) school trustees

One trustee is elected from each ward, and the non-victorious candidate with the most total votes is also elected.

Ward 1

David MacDougall - 3357
Andy Anderson - 2874
John Patrick Day - 2341

Ward 2

Ronald Zapisocki - 3539
Tony Catena - 2517
Eileen Ostapiw - 1662
Brent Achtymichuk - 1457
Al Hoven - 1434
Ramon Caluttung - 1063

Ward 3

Mary-Anne Razzolini - 5839
Jim Shinkaruk - 3142
Noel Salaysay - 1362

Ward 4

Ron Patsula - 2764
Krystina Tadman - 2516
Mervin Prediger - 1193

Ward 5

James Bateman - 1959
Mona-Lee Feehan - 1752
Erin Inglis - 1622
Gerald Archibald - 1323
Guy Tessier - 488

Ward 6

Brian Mitchell - 2677
Betty McNamee - 2182
Barbara Ann Thompson - 1767
Fred Zimmerman - 1254
Sheila Cerhit - 828

Municipal Airport Plebiscite

Are you in favour of bylaw No. 10,205 The Edmonton Municipal Airport Referendum bylaw?
Yes - 115773
No - 90566

References

City of Edmonton: Edmonton Elections

1992
1992 elections in Canada
1992 in Alberta